St. Margaret of Cortona School, also known as SMS, is a Middle States Accredited Catholic Elementary School located in Riverdale, in the Bronx, New York. St. Margaret's is a Roman Catholic, coed, and religious school. It was founded in 1911 by the Sisters of Charity and the parish of St. Margaret of Cortona.

Location

It is located at 452 W 260th St. Its cross streets are Riverdale Avenue and Delafield Avenue. St. Margaret's is placed in the Northern area of Riverdale, the 10471 section. Riverdale is home to the upper and middle class. Throughout the two zip codes 10471 and 10463, one can find a mixture of luxury apartments overlooking the Hudson River and many colleges, high schools, and grammar schools, both public and private.

Students and staff

St. Margaret Of Cortona School is a private grammar school with grades Pre-K through 8th. A full day pre-Kindergarten is also available for three- and four-year-olds. 331 students attend the school. The ethnicity of the students is as follows: White, non-Hispanic: 68%, Black, non-Hispanic: 3%, Hispanic: 18%, Asian/Pacific Islander: 11% (2003-2004 data).

Students attend school 180 school days per year, 5 days per week. A full day of school begins at 8:00 am and ends at 2:35 pm for grades K-4. Grades 5-8 get out at around 2:45. Students are taught Language, Arts, Reading, Writing, Computers, Mathematics, History, and Science.

Students who are registered in St. Margaret's Parish have priority for admission, but other Catholic students are welcomed if there are spare places. However, the families of students who live outside of the Parish pay higher annual fees.

The pastor is Fr. Brian McCarthy and the principal is Mr. Hugh Keenan, who took over from Sr. Kathleen in 2009. There are 16 teachers and the student to teacher ratio is 1:21. At the start of the September 2007 school year, two new teachers joined SMS: Ms. Christina Washburn, teaching pre-Kindergarten and Ms. Mallon, teaching Physical Education.  At the start of the September 2008 school year, Ms. Peterson joined, teaching science to 5th-8th grades and religion to 7th grade.

Students in each grade

Kindergarten: 26 students
First Grade: 27 students
Second Grade: 36 students
Third Grade: 25 students
Fourth Grade: 41 students
Fifth Grade: 36 students
Sixth Grade: 27 students
Seventh Grade: 19 students
Eighth Grade: 24  students

After-school and extra-curricular activities

This school offers a basketball team that's in the CYO division with 3 different levels for different age groups beginning with the gidgets (grades 3rd-4th), then the junior varsity (grades 5th-6th) team and the varsity team (grades 7th-8th).

An after-school program is given from 2:30pm (dismissal time) until 5pm. Students can play, get after assistance from teachers, and get their work done until pick up time. This grammar school also offers a school band, art classes, and music classes. Other extra-curriculars offered are student council, science fair, spelling bee, academic olympics, and an intramural soccer and basketball team. There is also a Parents Association that hosts dances, benefits, and meetings on how to improve the school for the better.

Stated aims

"The primary purpose of St. Margaret of Cortona School is to offer each child the spiritual, intellectual, personal and social foundation through which he/she will be able to lead a productive and fulfilling Christian life."

References & notes

External links
School website

Riverdale, Bronx
Private middle schools in the Bronx
Catholic elementary schools in the Bronx